Die Grafsteensangers (the tombstone singers) is a comical entertainment group in South Africa. The 12 members of the group, with ages varying between 18 and 83, sing mostly old Afrikaans songs with straight faces and in old costumes.

They have produced four CDs, one video and one DVD, and have performed at all the major Afrikaans arts festivals: Klein Karoo Nasionale Kunstefees (KKNK), Aardklop, Innibos, Volksbladfees, Suidoosterfees and UKkasie - a former Afrikaans art festival in London.

External links

 Afrikaans language article with more information
 Die Grafsteensangers Official website
 Aardklop Kunstefees, Potchefstroom
 Kleinkaroo Nasionale Kunstefees (KKNK), Oudtshoorn
 Volksblad-kunstefees, Bloemfontein 
 InniBos kunstefees, Nelspruit
 Suidoosterfees, Cape Town

South African musical groups